Marilú Mallet (born 1944) is a Chilean film essayist who was exiled to Canada in the 1970s. Like Angelina Vásquez in Finland and Valeria Sarmiento in France, she is notable as one of the first Chilean women film directors, producing much of her work in exile.

Filmography
 Il n'y a pas d'oubli (1975)
 Journal inachevé (1982)
 Mémoires d'une enfant des Andes (1985)
 Doble retrato (2000)
 La cueca sola (2003)

References

Bibliography
 Elizabeth Ramírez and Catalina Donoso (eds.) Nomadías. El cine de Marilú Mallet, Valeria Sarmiento y Angelina Vásquez (Ediciones Metales Pesados, 2016) ,

External links

1944 births
Living people
Chilean film directors
Chilean exiles
Chilean women film directors